Jantje Wilhelmina Elisabeth "Liesbeth" Spies (born 6 April 1966) is a Dutch politician. A member of the Christian Democratic Appeal (CDA), she has served as Mayor of Alphen aan den Rijn since 2014.

She served as Minister of the Interior and Kingdom Relations in the Cabinet Rutte I from 16 December 2011 to 5 November 2012. She was named to this post on 16 December 2011, following the appointment of her predecessor, Piet Hein Donner, to be the new Vice-President of the Council of State. She was a Member of the House of Representatives from 23 May 2002 to 17 June 2010 and served as acting Party Chair of the Christian Democratic Appeal from 1 November 2010 until 2 April 2011.

Following her departure from the House of Representatives she became the top candidate (lijsttrekker) for the CDA in the 2011 elections for the States-Provincial of South Holland. In the election the CDA lost over half its seats (going from thirteen seats to six) and went from largest party in the province to the fourth-largest when compared with the previous election in 2007. Despite this the CDA joined the coalition for the provincial government and Spies was appointed as a member of the States Deputed, with a portfolio including spatial planning and economic affairs. She vacated this position following her ministerial appointment.

From 8 July 2014 she was interim mayor of Stichtse Vecht.

As of 5 December 2014 Spies is mayor of her birthplace Alphen aan den Rijn.

Decorations

References

External links

Official
  Mr.Drs. J.W.E. (Liesbeth) Spies Parlement & Politiek

 

 

 

1966 births
Living people
Chairmen of the Christian Democratic Appeal
Christian Democratic Appeal politicians
Dutch management consultants
Dutch members of the Dutch Reformed Church
Dutch nonprofit directors
Dutch nonprofit executives
Dutch women jurists
Leiden University alumni
Mayors in South Holland
Mayors in Utrecht (province)
People from Stichtse Vecht
Members of the House of Representatives (Netherlands)
Members of the Provincial Council of South Holland
Members of the Provincial-Executive of South Holland
Ministers of the Interior of the Netherlands
Ministers of Kingdom Relations of the Netherlands
Officers of the Order of Orange-Nassau
People from Alphen aan den Rijn
Protestant Church Christians from the Netherlands
Women government ministers of the Netherlands
Women mayors of places in the Netherlands
20th-century Dutch civil servants
21st-century Dutch civil servants
21st-century Dutch women politicians
21st-century Dutch politicians
20th-century Dutch women